The 2013 Boston Red Sox season was the 113th season in the franchise's Major League Baseball history. Under new manager John Farrell, the Red Sox finished first in the American League East with a record of 97 wins and 65 losses. In the postseason, the Red Sox first defeated the AL wild card Tampa Bay Rays in the ALDS.  In the ALCS, the Red Sox defeated the American League Central champion Detroit Tigers in six games. Advancing to the World Series, the Red Sox defeated the National League champion St. Louis Cardinals in six games, to capture the franchise's eighth championship overall and third in ten years. The Red Sox became the second team to win the World Series the season after finishing last in their division; the first had been the 1991 Minnesota Twins.

Offseason

October
On October 4, 2012, the Red Sox fired Bobby Valentine.
On October 21, 2012, the Red Sox hired John Farrell to be the new manager of the team.
On October 21, 2012, the Red Sox traded SS Mike Avilés to the Blue Jays for David Carpenter as part of the compensation for manager John Farrell.

November
On November 10, 2012, the Red Sox came to an agreement with former Atlanta Braves catcher David Ross worth $6.2M over two years.
On November 21, 2012, the Red Sox signed former Oakland Athletics outfielder Jonny Gomes to a two-year contract worth $10 million.

December
On December 3, 2012, the Red Sox agreed to terms with former Texas Rangers and Los Angeles Angels catcher and 1st baseman Mike Napoli for a 3-year, $39 million contract. The deal was not official until late January because of his hip problems. The deal was reworked for a 1-year, $5 million contract.
On December 4, 2012, the Red Sox signed former Philadelphia Phillies and Los Angeles Dodgers outfielder Shane Victorino for a 3-year, $39 million contract.
On December 6, 2012, the Red Sox signed former Baltimore Orioles and Texas Rangers relief pitcher Koji Uehara to a deal.
On December 17, 2012, the Red Sox signed former Arizona Diamondbacks and Oakland Athletics shortstop Stephen Drew to a 1-year, $9.5 million deal.
On December 26, 2012, the Red Sox acquired closer Joel Hanrahan and second baseman/shortstop Brock Holt from the Pittsburgh Pirates in exchange for relief pitcher Mark Melancon, 1st baseman/outfielder Jerry Sands, infielder Iván DeJesús, Jr., and pitcher Stolmy Pimentel.

January
On January 31, 2013, the Red Sox signed veteran first baseman Lyle Overbay to a one-year minor league contract.

February
On February 20, 2013, the Red Sox acquired former Seattle Mariners first baseman Mike Carp for cash considerations.

Regular Season highlights

Season standings

Record vs. opponents

Opening Day

The 2013 Red Sox season opened on April 1, with an afternoon road game against the New York Yankees. Jon Lester went five innings, leading to an 8–2 win for the Red Sox.  This was Boston's first Opening Day victory since 2010.

Opening Day lineup

April
Following their Opening Day triumph, the Red Sox improved to 2–0 on Wednesday, April 3, in the second tilt of the three-game series, in a game that saw offseason acquisition Joel Hanrahan rack up his first save as a Red Sox. Boston failed to complete the sweep, however, with starting pitcher Ryan Dempster relinquishing a 4–2 defeat in his Red Sox debut the following evening.  In Toronto, the Sox split the first two games of a series against the Blue Jays on April 5 and 6, winning 6–4 in the first frame and falling 5–0 in the second.  Boston was then victorious in the rubber game, shutting out the Jays 13–0.

The Red Sox won their fourth straight against the Cleveland Indians on April 16. The Red Sox and Indians wore black armbands to honor the victims of the Boston Marathon bombing. A giant American flag flew at half-mast before the series opener with a moment of silence prior to the first pitch. A young Indians fan presented the Red Sox with a sign he wrote in red ink and ornamented with hearts. The note, which was hung in Boston's dugout, read: "From our city to your city: Our hearts and prayers go out to you, Boston. Love, Cleveland." For the entire game, a jersey with No. 617 (one of Boston's area codes), displaying "Boston" above the numerals and "Strong" below them, hung in the Sox' dugout. Additionally, to commemorate Jackie Robinson Day, both teams wore No. 42 jerseys. The Red Sox also placed closer Joel Hanrahan on the disabled list with a hamstring injury.

The Red Sox swept two consecutive series between April 13–18. One at home against the Tampa Bay Rays and another on the road against the Cleveland Indians, resulting in a six-game winning streak which improved their record to 11–4, and put them in first place in the American League East.

The Red Sox had a scheduled weekend series against the Kansas City Royals during April 19–21. The immediate Greater Boston area went on a citywide lockdown in search of a suspect in the Boston Marathon bombing on the morning of April 19 and the first game of the weekend was postponed. The Red Sox reported the decision was made "to support efforts of law enforcement officers." A make-up date for the game was not immediately announced.

However, with the second suspect captured that same evening and Fenway Park under tight security, play resumed Saturday, April 20 with a win of 4–3 by Boston over the Royals (assisted by a go-ahead three-run home run by Daniel Nava). Both teams honored the victims of the bombing tragedy by wearing special uniforms/logos. The Red Sox wore white home jerseys with "Boston" on the front instead of the customary "Red Sox" while Kansas City players and staff wore a "B Strong" patch on the front of their jerseys, with the shirts being auctioned off for funds to support victims of the bombing. Following a pregame ceremony, the Red Sox won their sixth straight game, their best start in 11 years with the win against Kansas City. David Ortiz was bothered by inflammation in both heels during spring training and didn't play in any exhibition games, but he was 2 for 4 in his return, tying the score 1-all with a sixth-inning RBI single off James Shields. The Red Sox later announced Friday's (April 19) game would be made up as part of a day-night doubleheader on Sunday (April 21). The regularly scheduled game took place at 1:35 p.m., and a nightcap at 7 p.m.

On April 21, Kansas City ended Boston's seven-game winning streak with a 4–2 win over the Red Sox in the opener of a day-night doubleheader. The Royals ended a season-opening streak of 16 games by Red Sox starters allowing three runs or less, tying an AL record achieved by the Oakland Athletics in 1978 and 1981. Red Sox RF Shane Victorino missed his first game of the season after leaving the game on April 20 with back spasms.

In the second game of the doubleheader, Kansas City narrowly beat Boston 5–4 in 10 innings to win the weekend series (and sweep the doubleheader), as a result of Lorenzo Cain walking with two outs and bases loaded in the 10th inning. Even with both wins against the Red Sox on April 21, Boston remained in first place in the AL East as did Kansas City in the AL Central. Dustin Pedroia reached base in all their first 18 games, the most consecutive games to start a season by a Red Sox 2B (breaking the record set by Pete Runnels in 1959). Koji Uehara went 18 1/3 scoreless innings before allowing Billy Butler's homer in the eighth inning of the night game. In his first two at bats on the day game, Jonny Gomes used a bat with the words "Boston Strong" on it as well as the names of the four people killed in the bombing and its aftermath. He popped out and grounded out, then said he planned to auction off the bats for charity.

Opening a new series against Oakland, the Red Sox came out victorious (9–6) in the first game on April 22. They were defeated (13–0) in a rain-shortened 7-inning game on April 23.  Boston proceeded to win the rubber game of the series on April 24 by a score of 6–5.

The Red Sox swept a four-game home stand on April 25–28 against the Astros, their first series against Houston since the Astros moved to the American League West.  The sweep improved Boston's record to 18–7.

The Red Sox closed April by falling, 9–7, on the road to the Blue Jays.

May
Boston opened the month of May in the middle of a three-game road series against Toronto.  Having lost the first game on April 30, the Red Sox won the next two games 10–1 and 3–1 on May 1 and 2.  Traveling to Texas to take on the Rangers, the team was shut out for the third time of the season, relinquishing 7 runs and 18 hits to Texas on May 3.  The Rangers took the next two games, on May 4 and 5, by respective scores of 5–1 and 4–3.  This marked the first time Boston was swept in the 2013 season.  The Red Sox' May slide continued when they lost three of four games at home against Minnesota from May 6–9.  They closed out their weeklong homestand by losing 2 of 3 to the Blue Jays from May 10–12.  On Sunday, May 12, the Red Sox' new 2013 starting pitcher, Ryan Dempster, fell to 2–4 in a game in which Boston relinquished 12 runs.

Traveling to Tampa Bay, the Red Sox recovered by taking two of three games from the Rays from May 14–16.  Boston scored three runs in the top of the 9th inning on May 16.  Opening a weekend series in Minnesota against the Twins, the Red Sox posted another come-from-behind victory on May 17, tying the game in the 7th inning and scoring the winning run in the 10th.  Boston swept the series with 12–5 and 5–1 triumphs on May 18 and 19, improving their winning streak to five games and their record to 27–17.  Boston then closed out their road trip with a three-game series against the Chicago White Sox.  The Red Sox lost the first two games on May 20 and 21, but avoided the sweep in a 6–2 victory on May 22 that brought starting pitcher Clay Buchholz's record to 7–0.  The Red Sox welcomed 2004–11 manager and two-time World Series champion manager Terry Francona back to Fenway Park on May 23 as they hosted Francona's new team, the Cleveland Indians.  Francona received a standing ovation in the first game of the four-game series.  Boston fell to Cleveland in a lopsided 12–3 loss on May 23, but proceeded to triumph in the following three matches on May 24, 25 and 26 to win the four-game series.  On Memorial Day, May 27, the Red Sox opened a four-game home-and-home series against Philadelphia, the team's first interleague series of 2013.  The Phillies are considered Boston's interleague "rival", playing the Red Sox every season.  The first two games of the series were held at Fenway Park, with the Red Sox winning on May 27 but then losing, 3–1, on May 28, in a game in which former Boston closer Jonathan Papelbon was awarded a save.  Papelbon repeated the feat again on May 29 as the series shifted to Philadelphia.  These were Papelbon's second and third saves against the Red Sox since leaving the team; he recorded the other on May 18, 2012.  Boston evened the four-game series with a 9–2 victory on Thursday, May 30.  Center fielder Jacoby Ellsbury set a Red Sox record with five stolen bases in the game.  The Red Sox closed out the month of May with a road loss against the archrival Yankees.

June
Boston's series in the Bronx continued on June 1 and 2, and the Red Sox racked up two victories to take the three-game series.  The Sox pounded the Yankees, 11–1, on June 1, and prevailed, 3–0, in a rain-shortened six-inning game on June 2 that was eventually called due to thunderstorms.  Clay Buchholz's record remained spotless at 8–0.  Coming home to Fenway Park, the Red Sox took 2 of 3 games from the Texas Rangers from June 4–6, including a 17–5 romp.  On June 8, Boston faced the Los Angeles Angels of Anaheim in a day-night doubleheader, losing the first game but winning the second as Buchholz's aforementioned perfect record improved to 9–0.  To close out the series, the Red Sox gave Angels starting pitcher Joe Blanton his tenth loss of the season in a 10–5 victory on June 9.  The condensed two-day series and day-night doubleheader were necessitated by effects from Tropical Storm Andrea which rained out the scheduled Friday, June 7 game.

Heading back out on the road, the Red Sox played a 14-inning game on national television as ESPN's Monday Night Baseball covered the 10–8 victory over the Tampa Bay Rays at Tropicana Field.  This was the second longest game by time in Rays history.  The Red Sox gave up a 6–0 lead after a first inning in which the first eight Boston batters all reached base, and then Andrew Bailey had a blown save in the 10th inning, giving up two Tampa Bay runs.  Eventually, well after midnight, the Red Sox scored two runs in the top of the 14th which were unanswerable by the Rays in the bottom half of the inning.  The Red Sox then split the two remaining games of the series to win 2 of its 3 games.  Boston lost 3 of 4 games in a road series against Baltimore from June 13–16.  After losing 3 out of 4 in a tough series to the Detroit Tigers, the Red Sox would go to win 5 of their next 6 in June and extending that streak for 9 out of 10 into July, which included a walk-off home run against the San Diego Padres by Jonny Gomes.

July
After sweeping the San Diego Padres the Red Sox headed west for a 10-game road trip and extended the winning streak to 5 games with a win against the Los Angeles Angels. On the following day Boston dropped a 4-run lead with 2 outs in the bottom of the 9th against the Halos, with Koji Uehara's second blown save out of six save opportunities since taking over the closer role from Andrew Bailey on June 21, and ultimately lost the game 9–7 in the 11th inning. Boston then lost the following 2 games against Los Angeles (splitting the season series 3–3 in the process) and the Seattle Mariners before starting a 4-game winning streak, taking 3 out of 4 games against the M's and the first game of the series against the A's. The 4 game series in Seattle saw the first Major League win for pitcher Steven Wright and the first appearance of Brandon Workman in the big leagues. Workman had his first start only 4 days later against the Oakland Athletics, taking a no-hit bid to the 7th inning. In Oakland the Red Sox bats went cold, scoring only 6 runs in 3 games, and losing the remaining 2 games which led to a season series split of 3–3. Boston headed with a 58–39 record to the All-Star break, leading the AL with 1 game ahead of the Athletics (56–39) and with most wins in the majors, just ahead of the St. Louis Cardinals with 57–36, who entered the break with the best record.

Following the All-Star break the Red Sox played the Yankees for the first time at Fenway in 2013. Like the previous two series in the Bronx, Boston could take 2 out of 3 games against New York. Mike Napoli secured the series win in the rubber match with a walk-off home run in the bottom of the 11th. With 1.5 games behind Boston, Tampa Bay visited the Fens for their third and final time. The Rays took game one and shrunk the lead to just .5 games, the smallest margin since Boston took over the lead in the AL East on May 27. In game 2 the Red Sox put themselves back to a 1.5 game lead, including Shane Victorino's steal of home in a delayed double steal with Dustin Pedroia, who agreed to a seven-year contract extension through the 2021 season a day later. Tampa Bay threatened the AL East lead again by taking game 3 but game 4 was rain delayed and later postponed to the scheduled off day on July 29, after Boston's 3 game road trip to Camden Yards and Rays' trip to the Bronx. In game one against Baltimore, the only team in the AL East Boston had a losing record against at that time, the Red Sox were shut out for the fourth time in July (with four shutouts in all of April, May and June combined) and lost the AL East top spot for the first time since May 27. Boston battled back and took game 2 with Stephen Drew going yard twice for the second time in his career in a single game. Game 2 also saw the ejection of David Ortiz in the top of the 7th, following an argument over balls and strikes with homeplate umpire Tim Timmons and the destruction of a dugout phone with his bat. In the rubber match, Big Papi homered for the 20th time that season, his 12th consecutive season with 20+ home runs and his 11th with Boston, joining Dwight Evans and Jim Rice but still behind Ted Williams, who accomplished this feat in 16 seasons with the Red Sox. Jon Lester earned his 10th individual win, the first Red Sox pitcher to reach that mark in 2013, and Boston were able to shut out the Orioles and reclaimed the AL East lead just to give it back the next day to the Rays in the makeup match of the 4 game series in which the Red Sox fell victim to a controversial call at home plate. Umpire Jerry Meals incorrectly ruled Daniel Nava out which would have tied the game in the 8th inning.  The Red Sox wrapped up the month of July at home with back-to-back wins against the Mariners, including a 15 inning game (the longest season game to date for the Red Sox). Both games saw the first major league wins for Brandon Workman, in his third start, and Drake Britton respectively. On July 30, Boston acquired starting pitcher Jake Peavy from the White Sox in a three-way deal, sending infielder José Iglesias to the Tigers and Avisaíl García from Detroit to Chicago.

August
August started just like July ended, with a walk-off win against the Mariners. In the series finale, the Red Sox were trailing by five in the ninth, but scored six runs for their 11th walk-off win in 2013. This was the biggest ninth inning come from behind victory since the 2007 Mother's Day Miracle against the Orioles and the biggest eighth inning comeback, trailing by 6, since July 3, 1940, against the Athletics, at that time still located in their origin city Philadelphia.
Despite winning the first two series against the Diamondbacks and the Astros the Red Sox played .500 ball for the first  weeks of August. The interleague series against Arizona saw the first start for newly acquired starting pitcher Jake Peavy, who tied the series with a strong performance after the D-Backs took game one, with the winning run driven in by former Red Sox player Cody Ross. In a combined effort of Doubront and the bullpen, Boston shut-out the team from the NL West. With no off-day the Red Sox headed west to play the Astros for the first time in Minute Maid Park as a team of the American League. In a slugging fest, with 25 runs and 26 hits of both teams combined, Boston took game two after completely failing to score in game one and took the series in game three with a come from behind victory in the ninth. Slowly crawling their way back east the Red Sox stopped for a four-game series in Kansas City dropping 3 games before heading to Toronto, dropping two out of three against the AL East rival but still maintaining a 2-game lead over the Rays. On their second visit to Boston, the Yankees clinched their first series of the season against the fierce rival by taking two games out of three. Red Sox lost their season tying three series in a row.

The tides turned when Boston headed to the west coast for a three-game series against the 2012 World Series champion San Francisco and the, to that time, red hot Dodgers. Lester with the help of Workman shut-out the Giants in game one before the Red Sox dropped game two and giving the AL East lead to the Rays but earning the lead back holding San Francisco to a single run in game three. In game one in Los Angeles Boston could not score but were able to take game two and three, inflicting the Dodgers first series loss since June 16.

Back home in Boston the Red Sox took two out of three against Baltimore and the two remaining games in August against the White Sox for their 28th series win that season and a -game lead over the Rays in the AL East.

September
Boston swept the White Sox and extended the AL East lead to  games but ended a streak of 11 games allowing only three runs or less. Another streak however continued in game one of the home series against the Tigers. John Lackey received absolutely no run support for the fifth time of his last 11 starts and four or less runs in the ninth game over the same stretch. Allowing only one run and handing Max Scherzer just his second loss of the season, the Red Sox took game two and exploded in game three, scoring 20 runs, a season high amongst all Major League teams, on 19 hits including 8 long balls. On their last trip to the Bronx, Boston headed into the seventh with a five-run lead, but the combination of Peavy, Thornton and Tazawa could not stop the Yankees from scoring 6 runs. Down on their last strike, Boston scored against New York's closer Mariano Rivera in the ninth and took game one in extra frames. Down by five, Boston scored nine runs in two innings, including a grand slam by Mike Napoli and took game two. In search for run support the offense gave Lackey 13 runs in game three, the most in any start for him this season, to extend the winning streak to five and extending the lead in the AL East to a season-high  games but failed to sweep the four-game set when Workman gave up a walk-off wild pitch in the bottom of the ninth after Rivera suffered his second blown save in the series while trying for a two-inning save. Buchholz returned to the rotation three months after his last start on June 8 and protected his undefeated season record in game one of a three-game series in St. Peterburg by allowing, with the help of the relievers, no runs. In game two Mike Carp hit a game-deciding pinch-hit grand slam in the tenth but Boston failed to sweep the Rays in the series finale.

Back at Fenway Park for the last regular season home stand, Jarrod Saltalamacchia became the third Red Sox player within a week to hit a grand slam, breaking a tie in the seventh against the Yankees, and Koji Uehara set a new franchise record by retiring his 37th consecutive batter. Jon Lester and Clay Buchholz then secured the series sweep by back-to-back strong outings. Lester allowed only one run on three hits, while Buchholz allowed only one unearned run on two hits.  Struggling again against the Orioles, Boston dropped the first two games before John Lackey posted a two hit gem and the Red Sox clinched a spot in the postseason. With a Tampa Bay loss, the Red Sox cut the magic number for winning the division down to 1. A day later the Red Sox clinched their first AL East title since 2007 by beating the Toronto Blue Jays 6–3. In game two Buchholz suffered his first loss of the season, albeit allowing only three runs, two of them earned. Boston secured the series with a 5–2 win on their last regular season home game.

On their last interleague trip, the Red Sox split the two-game series against the Colorado Rockies, losing game one but winning game two, scoring 15 runs. Will Middlebrooks posted two home runs, including the fifth grand slam in the month of September for Boston, and David Ortiz collected his 100th RBI on the season. On September 27, the Red Sox secured home field advantage for the American League Division Series by beating the Orioles 12–3. Ortiz hit his 30th home run of the season, making it his seventh season with 30 HR/100 RBI, tying Ted Williams for the club record. A day later, the Red Sox secured home field advantage throughout the playoffs thanks to a 7–5 loss by the Oakland A's to the Seattle Mariners, making the last two games virtually pointless. Boston lost both games, giving up a 5–0 lead in the fifth in game three. The Red Sox headed into the postseason with the best record in the majors, tied with the St. Louis Cardinals.

Postseason highlights

American League Division Series vs. Tampa Bay Rays

Game 1, October 4
3:07 p.m. (EDT) at Fenway Park in Boston, Massachusetts

The Red Sox had a shaky opening in Game 1, with Jon Lester surrendering solo home runs to Sean Rodriguez and Ben Zobrist.  However, the Red Sox' offense ignited in the bottom of the fourth inning, with several doubles combining with poor Tampa Bay fielding to stitch together a five-run frame.  Boston then tacked on three more in the bottom of the 5th and four more in the bottom of the 8th.  Jon Lester pitched 7 2/3 innings, having surrendered only 3 hits and 2 earned runs.  Junichi Tazawa and Ryan Dempster provided effective relief pitching in the eighth and ninth to seal the Game 1 victory for the Red Sox.

Game 2, October 5
5:37 p.m. (EDT) at Fenway Park in Boston, Massachusetts

David Ortiz had his first multi-home run postseason game to lead the Red Sox to victory, smashing solo blasts in the 1st and 8th innings.   Tampa Bay starter David Price had a rough outing, being charged with all seven of Boston's runs.  The Rays attempted to catch up with the Red Sox with significant offense in the 2nd, 5th, and 6th innings, but their efforts were fruitless.  In the 7th and 8th innings, the Rays threatened with two runners on base, but in each frame no runners could score for Tampa Bay due to inning-ending 4–6–3 double plays to conserve the Sox' two-run lead, which stretched to a three-run gap with Ortiz's home run.  In the top of the ninth, closer Koji Uehara struck out the first two batters he was facing and the game ended with an unassisted ground out by Mike Napoli to secure the 2–0 series lead.  Throughout the game, fans at Fenway Park heckled Wil Myers, a Tampa Bay right fielder who made a critical error that had helped open up scoring for the Red Sox in Game 1.

Game 3, October 7
6:07 p.m. (EDT) at Tropicana Field in St. Petersburg, Florida

The Red Sox jumped on the scoreboard early in Game 3, with a one-run top of the 1st inning, but Rays starter Alex Cobb kept the Rays in the game.  In the top of the 5th inning, Boston added two more runs, giving them a three-run cushion, but their lead was shattered in the bottom half of the frame with one swing, a three-run home run by Evan Longoria.  Neither team scored again until the bottom 8th, when Delmon Young drove in a go-ahead RBI.  The Red Sox battled back in the top of the 9th inning, tying the game with runners on second and third base, and closer Koji Uehara's efforts retired two batters easily in the bottom of the 9th, until Tampa Bay catcher José Lobatón suddenly crushed a walk-off solo home run.

Game 4, October 8
8:37 p.m. (EDT) at Tropicana Field in St. Petersburg, Florida

Starter Jake Peavy pitched 5 2/3 solid innings for Boston, but the Rays got on the board first in the bottom of the fifth with a deep outfield RBI double by David DeJesus. This, however, would prove to be Tampa Bay's lone run. Boston threatened early with two walks and a single, which could not score David Ortiz from second, in the top of the second. With the bases loaded the Rays pulled their struggling starter Jeremy Hellickson, responsible for all three runners, and Jamey Wright successfully pitched out of the jam with a strike out and a double play. Tampa Bay sent a postseason record nine pitchers to the mound in the course of the game, emptying their bullpen, and scheduled game five starter David Price was warming in the pen. In the top of the seventh, with two on and two outs, Jacoby Ellsbury stole second base, his fourth steal of the series, and advanced to third on a wild pitch, which scored Xander Bogaerts from third. Shane Victorino legged out the two out infield hit to score the runner from third and gave the Red Sox the lead. In the top of the ninth, a melting Rays closer Fernando Rodney walked two of the first three batters he faced and drilled Victorino on a two strike pitch. This was the fourth time Victorino was hit by a pitch in this series. With the bases loaded Dustin Pedroia delivered a sacrifice fly which scored Bogaerts to add some insurance for Boston. Closer Koji Uehara came into the game with two outs in the bottom of the eighth and successfully racked up the four-out save.  Uehara struck out Evan Longoria, who had hit a game-tying home run in Game 3, to send the Rays home and to secure a spot in the 2013 American League Championship Series

American League Championship Series vs. Detroit Tigers

Game 1, October 12
8:00 p.m. (EDT) at Fenway Park in Boston, Massachusetts

Boston's bats were ice cold in Game 1, nearly ceding a combined no-hitter to the Tigers. The Red Sox saved themselves from the embarrassment of being no-hit with a Daniel Nava single in the bottom of the ninth inning, but Boston failed to rally further to make up the one-run gap.  Detroit had scored the game's lone run by virtue of a Jhonny Peralta RBI in the sixth inning.  While Red Sox starter Jon Lester allowed only one run, he did give up nine hits and struck out six batters, whereas Detroit's Aníbal Sánchez struck out twelve.  Sánchez walked six batters, but those who were fortunate enough to get on base could never stitch together any runs. Ultimately, Boston's disgruntled offense would strike out 17 times, an ALCS record.

Game 2, October 13
8:00 p.m. (EDT) at Fenway Park in Boston, Massachusetts

Tiger pitching again came out strong, with starter Max Scherzer holding the Red Sox hitless through five innings.  At the end of the fifth inning, the Red Sox had not recorded a base hit but had held Detroit to only one run, making the game look very similar circumstantially to Game 1.  However, Red Sox starter Clay Buchholz gave up home runs to Miguel Cabrera and Alex Avila in the top of the 6th, widening the Tigers' lead to five runs.  The Red Sox scrounged out one run in the bottom of the 6th, a Dustin Pedroia RBI double which seemed insignificant at the time but would prove crucial later.  Neither team scored in the seventh inning.  In the bottom of the eighth inning, the Red Sox were able to load the bases, and David Ortiz crushed a two-out grand slam to tie the score at 5–5 off the first pitch from new Detroit pitcher Joaquín Benoit. The home run provided one of the 2013 season's most enduring images, when Tigers outfielder (and Ortiz's close friend) Torii Hunter dove over the wall into the Red Sox' bullpen in an attempt to catch the ball, resulting in his legs being completely vertical while Boston Police officer Steve Horgan lifted his arms in celebration. Following the home run, Mike Napoli struck out to stop the bleeding for the Tigers.  Boston closer Koji Uehara held Detroit hitless in the top of the ninth inning.  Jonny Gomes started off the Red Sox offense in the bottom of the ninth with a single.  Gomes was then able to advance to second base on a flubbed fielding play.  Gomes then took third base on a Rick Porcello wild pitch, and easily scored the winning run on a walk-off hit from Jarrod Saltalamacchia, capping the stunning comeback.

Earlier in the day, the New England Patriots had a stunning comeback of their own, with quarterback Tom Brady throwing a touchdown with 5 seconds left to beat the New Orleans Saints at home by a score of 30–27. The dual-victory was renowned as one of the most sensational days in Boston sports history, and will be remembered for some time.

Game 3, October 15
4:00 p.m. (EDT) at Comerica Park in Detroit, Michigan

Mike Napoli's one-out, seventh-inning solo home run was one of only four hits surrendered by Detroit starter Justin Verlander, and yet it was enough to lift the Red Sox to victory.  The Tigers outhit the Red Sox, and Detroit had several prime scoring opportunities, especially in the first and eighth innings, but all were stanched by effective pitching from starter John Lackey, relievers Craig Breslow and Junichi Tazawa, and closer Koji Uehara.

Although there was still daylight present, Game 3 temporarily ceased in the middle of the second inning due to a light failure at Comerica Park which commenced at 4:42 p.m. EDT and lasted for seventeen minutes.

Game 4, October 16
8:00 p.m. (EDT) at Comerica Park in Detroit, Michigan

Boston starter Jake Peavy melted early, surrendering a five-run second inning to the Tigers.  Detroit added two more in the fourth inning before being relieved by Brandon Workman, and that was all the Tigers would need to coast to a 7–3 victory.  Boston scratched out runs in the sixth, seventh, and ninth innings, but could never ignite an offensive rally as they did in Game 2.

With the loss, the series was guaranteed to return to Boston for Game 6 at Fenway Park on Saturday, October 19.

Game 5, October 17
8:00 p.m. (EDT) at Comerica Park in Detroit, Michigan

Mike Napoli hit a 445 ft blast of a solo home-run off of Detroit's Aníbal Sánchez (who had surrendered no hits to the Red Sox in Game 1), igniting a 3-run second inning that saw David Ross and Jacoby Ellsbury also drive in runs.  Boston added an important insurance run in the third, which turned out to be the difference in game five, with Mike Napoli scoring on a wild pitch by Sánchez.  The Red Sox allowed Detroit to stay in the game, however, surrendering a run each in the fifth, sixth, and seventh innings.  In the seventh, the Tigers scored on a double play, bringing them within a run.  Craig Breslow pitched to only one batter in the bottom of the eighth inning, and then closer Koji Uehara again worked his magic to secure the win for Boston, striking out two batters and earning a five-out save.

Game 6, October 19
8:00 p.m. (EDT) at Fenway Park in Boston, Massachusetts

The Red Sox scored first, but, with the bases loaded and nobody out, the Tigers took the lead on a two-run single off the Green Monster. Reliever Brandon Workman stopped the bleeding and in the bottom of the seventh inning, Shane Victorino's one-out grand slam home run off of Detroit reliever José Veras launched the Red Sox into a 5–2 lead, which they maintained to finish off the Tigers in six games and head to the World Series against the St. Louis Cardinals, who had punched their ticket to the Fall Classic a day earlier by defeating the Dodgers.  Victorino's grand slam was the second in the ALCS by the Red Sox, which was the first time that a team hit more than one grand slam in the same series in the postseason since the Atlanta Braves in the 1998 NLDS.

2013 World Series vs. St. Louis Cardinals

Game 1, October 23
7:30 p.m. (EDT) at Fenway Park in Boston, Massachusetts

Jon Lester pitched a gem, going 7 2/3 shutout innings as the Red Sox started early with a bases clearing 3-run double by Mike Napoli in the first. They extended their to lead to 5–0 in the second, during which Carlos Beltrán robbed David Ortiz of a second postseason grand slam, injuring himself on the play. Ortiz later put an exclamation mark on the game with a 2-run shot to right in the 7th, for his 4th HR of the postseason. Matt Holliday prevented a shutout by hitting a solo shot into the Green Monster in the top of the 9th off Ryan Dempster. Dating back to 2004, the Red Sox have scored a run in the first inning for five straight games against the Cardinals in postseason play and have won nine straight World Series games.

Game 2, October 24
7:30 p.m. (EDT) at Fenway Park in Boston, Massachusetts

The Red Sox suffered their first World Series loss since 1986 in that year's Game 7.  Down 1–0 in the sixth inning, further long-ball theatrics were showcased by David Ortiz, who hit a two-run home run with Dustin Pedroia on base to give Boston a 2–1 lead.  However, it all went to naught for the Red Sox in the seventh inning when two fielding errors on the same play gave St. Louis the lead.  With the bases loaded with one out and Craig Breslow pitching in relief, Matt Carpenter hit a fly ball to left field, but the runner on third beat the throw home, tying the game.  Catcher Jarrod Saltalamacchia then flubbed the ball, which was retrieved by the pitcher Breslow.  Breslow then made an errant throw to third base, allowing Jon Jay to score as well, giving St. Louis a 3–2 advantage.  Carlos Beltrán then singled to bring in a fourth Cardinals run.  The Red Sox' subsequent comeback attempts failed, and Cardinals closer Trevor Rosenthal struck out the side in the bottom of the ninth to end the game.

Game 3, October 26
7:30 p.m. (EDT) at Busch Stadium in St. Louis, Missouri

St. Louis took early advantage of starter Jake Peavy, who gave up two runs on four hits in the first inning. After that Peavy settled in and pitched himself out of a bases loaded, nobody out situation in the fourth. Boston tied the game after a leadoff triple by rookie Xander Bogaerts who scored on a fielders choice at second by Mike Carp in the fifth and Daniel Nava drove in Shane Victorino, who reached base on a leadoff walk in the sixth and was advanced to third by a David Ortiz base hit. Félix Doubront pitched two scoreless innings and Craig Breslow took over in the seventh but was quickly replaced by Junichi Tazawa after giving up a hit and drilled Carlos Beltrán. Both inherited runners scored on a double by Matt Holliday. The Red Sox came back again in the eighth after a leadoff single by Jacoby Ellsbury and Shane Victorino was hit by reliever Carlos Martínez. Dustin Pedroia advanced the runners on a ground out, Ortiz was intentionally walked to load the bases and Cardinals closer Trevor Rosenthal took over for a 5 out save which he ended up blowing after Nava reached on a force out at second, scoring Ellsbury and a single by Bogaerts, scoring Victorino. In the bottom of the ninth with one out, Koji Uehara took the mound and gave up a double on his first pitch to Allen Craig which advanced Yadier Molina, who singled earlier in the inning, to third. On a ground ball to Pedroia, who was playing the infield grass, Molina was tagged out at home by Jarrod Saltalamacchia, who fired to third to try to get Craig. Will Middlebrooks was not able to field the ball cleanly and it got away from him. Craig stumbled over the fallen Middlebrooks and Daniel Nava, who backed up the play, quickly fired to home but third base umpire Jim Joyce called obstruction and gave Craig home plate, scoring the first obstruction walk-off win in a World Series ever.

Game 4, October 27
8:00 p.m. (EDT) at Busch Stadium in St. Louis, Missouri

Like in the last two games, St. Louis scored first. Matt Carpenter singled in the third and advanced on a fielding error by Jacoby Ellsbury. Carlos Beltrán drove in the run on a base hit, unearned for starter Clay Buchholz. David Ortiz lead off the fifth on a double, followed by back-to-back walks by Jonny Gomes on 10 pitches and Xander Bogaerts. Stephen Drew scored Ortiz on a sacrifice fly. With two outs in the sixth, Dustin Pedroia singled and Ortiz drew a four pitch walk before Gomes hit a three-run shot into the Red Sox bullpen, his first hit of this World Series. Félix Doubront, who relieved Buchholz after four innings, pitched 2 2/3 innings before giving up his only hit, a double by Shane Robinson. Craig Breslow gave up a hit against Carpenter, scoring the sixth of seven inherited runners in this series by Boston relievers, and a walk to Beltrán. He was immediately relieved by Junichi Tazawa who stranded both runners. In the eighth, after his third hit on three at bats that night, Ortiz was pinched run for by Quintin Berry who stole the first Red Sox base on the very first attempt in the series against the Cardinals. John Lackey took the mound in the bottom of the eighth. With one out Yadier Molina reached base and advanced to second on a throwing error by Bogaerts and even took third on a wild pitch but St. Louis could not bring him home. In the bottom of the ninth Red Sox closer Koji Uehara took over, giving up a one out long single to Allen Craig. Uehara ended the game by picking off pinch runner Kolten Wong, earning his first save of the series and the sixth in this postseason. This was the first time a World Series game ended on a pickoff. Red Sox pitching struck out five batters, all looking.

Game 5, October 28
7:30 p.m. (EDT) at Busch Stadium in St. Louis, Missouri

Game 5 saw a battle of the aces with Adam Wainwright on the short end as Lester pitched another gem of 7 2/3 innings. Boston struck first on back-to-back one out doubles by Dustin Pedroia and David Ortiz, who continued his monstrous tear, hitting .733 in the series. Wainwright ended up striking out the side in the first two innings before Jon Lester broke the streak with a groundout. St. Louis had back-to-back leadoff singles in the second and third by Carlos Beltrán and David Freese, latter advanced to second on a sacrifice bunt by Pete Kozma but was left in scoring position. In the fourth Ortiz tied a World Series record by Billy Hatcher on a hit, reaching base in nine consecutive plate appearances, but failed to set a new record by flying out to center field in the sixth. With one out in the bottom of the fourth, Matt Holliday hit a solo shot to center field to tie the game. Boston threatened in the fifth after a leadoff hit by Xander Bogaerts and a one out single by David Ross but Wainwright struck out Lester and Ellsbury to strand both runners. After a leadoff single by Bogaerts, Stephen Drew walked and Ross drove in one run on a ground rule double to left field. With two runners in scoring position Ellsbury's single scored Drew but Ross was tagged out at home plate on the throw by Shane Robinson. In the bottom of the eighth Lester allowed a one out double against Freese and Koji Uehara took over the mound for a four out save after Kozma hit a fly ball to left field for the second out of the inning. Uehara struck out pinch hitter Matt Adams on three pitches for the third out. The Red Sox closer struck out Matt Carpenter, grounded out pinch hinter John Jay and Holliday flew out to right field to earn the save in back-to-back games. This was the first game of this series neither team committed an error.

Game 6, October 30
7:30 p.m. (EDT) at Fenway Park in Boston, Massachusetts

St. Louis threatened first with back-to-back hits in the second by Allen Craig, who hit a wallball leadoff single, and Yadier Molina with another single to left field. John Lackey induced two flyouts against Matt Adams and David Freese, before the runners advanced on a wild pitch, but Lackey ended the threat by striking out Jon Jay. In the same inning the first two batters for the Red Sox reached base, a single by Jonny Gomes and a walk by Shane Victorino, but after back-to-back popouts into foul territory by Xander Bogaerts and Stephen Drew, David Ross struck out. Jacoby Ellsbury lead off the third inning with a single and Pedroia advanced him to second on a groundout. With first base open, Michael Wacha intentionally walked David Ortiz, Ortiz's second walk of the game, and struck out Mike Napoli but then drilled Gomes and with the bases loaded Victorino hit a double off the Green Monster, his first hit in this series, scoring all three runners. Victorino just missed his second grand slam of this postseason but Wacha's streak ended, who to this point had not allowed a hit with runners in scoring position this October. Bogaerts lined out to third base to end the inning. In the top of the fourth, the just awarded AL Golden Glove winner on second base, Dustin Pedroia, committed a fielding error on a possible double play ball with one out and Craig on first. Lackey pitched out of the jam on a flyout by Adams and striking out Freese. On the first pitch in the bottom of the fourth, Drew homered into the Red Sox bullpen and Ellsbury followed him with a double. After a flyout by Pedroia which advanced Ellsbury to third, Ortiz was again intentionally walked. Cardinals manager Mike Matheny tried to stop the bleeding and replaced his rookie starter with game 4 losing pitcher Lance Lynn, who quickly warmed up after Drew went yard earlier in this inning. Lynn could not make an out as Napoli drove in Ellsbury on a single, Gomes drew a walk to load the bases and Victorino collected his fourth RBI on a base hit which scored Ortiz from third. Seth Maness relieved Lynn and ended the inning by striking out Bogaerts. Michael Wacha left the game with six earned runs in 3 2/3 innings of work. Prior to this game he posted a 1.00 ERA in the postseason. The Cardinals threatened again in the fifth after a leadoff hit by John Jay, a one out single by Carpenter and a flyout to right field by Carlos Beltrán, which advanced Jay to third. But Lackey induced another flyout against Matt Holliday. St. Louis brought in their fourth arm of the night in the bottom of the fifth, Kevin Siegrist. After two quick outs, Ellsbury reached on a fielding error by Matt Carpenter and was then in a rundown, after he took off too early on a steal attempt. Siegrist misplayed his position on first base, standing too far away, and Ellsbury safely returned to the bag. Lackey got two quick outs in the top of the seventh, before Daniel Descalso hit a long single into right field and Carpenter followed him with a double to left field, advancing the runner to third. Beltrán drove in the Cardinal's first run on a left field single into the shift and advanced on a wild pitch. Lackey walked Holliday to load the bases before he was relieved by Junichi Tazawa. He induced a ground ball against Allen Craig to first base, Mike Napoli bobbled the ball but could recover in time and Tazawa, covering first base, got the out. With Ellsbury on first, Pedroia grounded into a fielder's choice in the bottom of the eighth, which ended his streak of reaching base safely in 20 consecutive postseason games at home. In a non-save situation, the Red Sox brought in their closer Koji Uehara, in relief of Brandon Workman, who worked a quiet eighth inning. John Jay flew out to Gomes, Descalso popped out to Gomes and Carpenter struck out and the Red Sox clinched their eighth World Series.

John Lackey became the first pitcher in MLB history to win two World Series clinching games with two different teams. Lackey won the series clincher with the Los Angeles Angels in 2002 as a rookie.

David Ortiz was named 2013 World Series MVP for the first time in his career with 2 HRs, 6 RBIs, .688 batting average and 1.948 OPS. He is the first non-Yankee to win three rings with one team since Jim Palmer did it for the 1966-70-83 Baltimore Orioles. He is also only the 2nd exclusive designated hitter to be awarded the World Series MVP (2009-Hideki Matsui).  The Red Sox are also the first team to win three Championships after 2000, having previously been the first to win two Championships after 2000, when they won in 2007.

This was the first World Series victory clinched at Fenway Park by the Boston Red Sox in 95 years, having won their 2004 and 2007 titles on the road, and the first time a World Series was won at Fenway since 1975 (when the Cincinnati Reds defeated the Red Sox).

2013 Roster

Beards

Throughout the regular season, numerous Red Sox players sported considerable facial hair, which drew media attention and later drove team marketing. The trend began during spring training, when outfielder Jonny Gomes arrived considerably unshaven. This caught the eye of first baseman Mike Napoli and catcher David Ross, who decided to also stop shaving. With time, other players joined, including second baseman Dustin Pedroia; designated hitter David Ortiz; outfielders Mike Carp and Shane Victorino; pitchers Brandon Workman, Ryan Dempster, John Lackey, and Clay Buchholz; and catcher Jarrod Saltalamacchia. Other players joined from time to time.

The trend grabbed the attention of the audience, who started wearing real and fake beards to the stadium in support of the team. Team marketing started campaigns to take advantage of the beards' popularity. They even gave nicknames to each player's beards such as "The Ironsides" (Gomes), "The Siesta" (Napoli), or "The Saltine" (Saltalamacchia). Steve Rushin wrote an article and interview for Sports Illustrated, "The Hirsute of Happiness", exploring how the beard trend had helped unite the team. The team has also developed the custom of tugging each other's beards to celebrate a hit or home run.

After the team won the World Series, some of the players decided to shave their beards. Victorino and Ortiz shaved theirs during a charity event sponsored by Gillette. At the event, the Boston company donated $100,000 to One Fund Boston, a charity dedicated to the victims of the April 2013 Boston Marathon bombing.

Game log

|- style="text-align:center; background-color:#bbffbb;"
| 1 || April 1 || @ Yankees || 8–2 || Lester (1–0) || Sabathia (0–1) ||   || Yankee Stadium || 49,514 || 1–0 || W1
|- style="text-align:center; background-color:#bbffbb;"
| 2 || April 3 || @ Yankees || 7–4 || Buchholz (1–0) || Kuroda (0–1) || Hanrahan (1) || Yankee Stadium || 40,216 || 2–0 || W2
|- style="text-align:center; background-color:#ffbbbb;"
| 3 || April 4 || @ Yankees || 2–4 || Pettitte (1–0) || Dempster (0–1) || Rivera (1) || Yankee Stadium || 40,611 || 2–1 || L1
|- style="text-align:center; background-color:#bbffbb;"
| 4 || April 5 || @ Blue Jays || 6–4 || Tazawa (1–0) || Johnson (0–1) || Hanrahan (2) || Rogers Centre || 45,328 || 3–1 || W1
|- style="text-align:center; background-color:#ffbbbb;"
| 5 || April 6 || @ Blue Jays || 0–5 ||Happ (1–0) ||Lackey (0–1)  ||  || Rogers Centre || 45,797 || 3–2 || L1
|- style="text-align:center; background-color:#bbffbb;"
| 6 || April 7 || @ Blue Jays || 13–0 || Lester (2–0) || Dickey (0–2) ||  || Rogers Centre || 41,168 || 4–2 || W1
|- style="text-align:center; background-color:#bbffbb;"
| 7 || April 8 || Orioles || 3–1 || Buchholz (2–0) || Chen (0–1) || Hanrahan (3) || Fenway Park || 37,008 || 5–2 || W2
|- style="text-align:center; background-color:#ffbbbb;"
| 8 || April 10 || Orioles || 5–8 || O'Day (1–0) || Hanrahan (0–1) || Johnson (3) || Fenway Park || 30,862* || 5–3 || L1
|- style="text-align:center; background-color:#ffbbbb;"
| 9 || April 11 || Orioles || 2–3 || Matusz (1–0) || Mortensen (0–1) || Johnson (4) || Fenway Park || 27,704 || 5–4 || L2
|- style="text-align:center; background-color:#bbbbbb;"
| – || April 12 || Rays ||colspan="8" | Postponed (rain) (Makeup date: June 18) 
|- style="text-align:center; background-color:#bbffbb;"
| 10 || April 13 || Rays || 2–1 (10) || Tazawa (2–0) || Gomes (0–1) ||  || Fenway Park || 33,039 || 6–4 || W1
|- style="text-align:center; background-color:#bbffbb;"
| 11 || April 14 || Rays || 5–0 || Buchholz (3–0) || Cobb (1–1) ||  || Fenway Park || 35,198 || 7–4 || W2
|- style="text-align:center; background-color:#bbffbb;"
| 12 || April 15 || Rays || 3–2 || Bailey (1–0) || Peralta (0–1)  ||  || Fenway Park || 37,449 || 8–4 || W3
|- style="text-align:center; background-color:#bbffbb;"
| 13 || April 16 || @ Indians || 7–2 || Doubront (1–0) || Jiménez (0–2) ||  || Progressive Field || 9,143 || 9–4 || W4
|- style="text-align:center; background-color:#bbffbb;"
| 14 || April 17 || @ Indians || 6–3 || Aceves (1–0) || Masterson (3–1) || Bailey (1) || Progressive Field || 10,282 || 10–4 || W5
|- style="text-align:center; background-color:#bbffbb;"
| 15 || April 18 || @ Indians || 6–3 || Lester (3–0) || McAllister (1–2) || Bailey (2) || Progressive Field || 12,936 || 11–4 || W6
|- style="text-align:center; background-color:#bbbbbb;"
| – || April 19 || Royals ||colspan="8" | Postponed (lockdown in Boston due to manhunt for Boston Marathon bombing suspect) (Makeup date: doubleheader April 21)
|- style="text-align:center; background-color:#bbffbb;"
| 16 || April 20 || Royals || 4–3 || Buchholz (4–0) || Herrera (1–2) || Bailey (3) || Fenway Park || 35,152 || 12–4 || W7
|- style="text-align:center; background-color:#ffbbbb;"
| 17 || April 21^ || Royals || 2–4 || Santana (2–1) || Dempster (0–2) || Holland (4) || Fenway Park || 31,483 || 12–5 || L1
|- style="text-align:center; background-color:#ffbbbb;"
| 18 || April 21^ || Royals || 4–5 (10) || Herrera (2–2) || Miller (0–1) || Holland (5)  || Fenway Park || 33,270 || 12–6 || L2
|- style="text-align:center; background-color:#bbffbb;"
| 19 || April 22 || Athletics || 9–6 || Doubront (2–0) || Griffin (2–1) || Bailey (4) || Fenway Park || 28,926 || 13–6 || W1
|- style="text-align:center; background-color:#ffbbbb;"
| 20 || April 23 || Athletics || 0–13 (7) (rain) || Colon (3–0) || Aceves (1–1) ||  || Fenway Park || 29,006 || 13–7 || L1 
|- style="text-align:center; background-color:#bbffbb;"
| 21 || April 24 || Athletics || 6–5 || Lester (4–0) || Anderson (1–4) || Bailey (5) || Fenway Park || 29,274 || 14–7 || W1
|- style="text-align:center; background-color:#bbffbb;"
| 22 || April 25 || Astros || 7–2 || Buchholz (5–0) || Humber (0–5) ||  || Fenway Park || 30,093 || 15–7 || W2
|- style="text-align:center; background-color:#bbffbb;"
| 23 || April 26 || Astros || 7–3 || Dempster (1–2) || Bédard (0–2) ||  || Fenway Park || 29,312 || 16–7 || W3
|- style="text-align:center; background-color:#bbffbb;"
| 24 || April 27 || Astros || 8–4 || Doubront (3–0) || Peacock (1–3) || || Fenway Park || 34,726 || 17–7 || W4
|- style="text-align:center; background-color:#bbffbb;"
| 25 || April 28 || Astros || 6–1 || Lackey (1–1) || Norris (3–3) ||  || Fenway Park || 36,527 || 18–7 || W5
|- style="text-align:center; background-color:#ffbbbb;"
| 26 || April 30 || @ Blue Jays || 7–9 || Delabar (2–1) || Tazawa (2–1) || Janssen (7) || Rogers Centre || 22,915 || 18–8 || L1
|-
|colspan=11 style="text-align:left"|*This attendance figure marked the official end of the Red Sox' sellout streak extending back to May 15, 2003.^Day–night doubleheader
|- 

|- style="text-align:center; background-color:#bbffbb;"
| 27 || May 1 || @ Blue Jays || 10–1 || Buchholz (6–0) || Buehrle (1–2) ||  || Rogers Centre || 21,094 || 19–8 || W1
|- style="text-align:center; background-color:#bbffbb;"
| 28 || May 2 || @ Blue Jays || 3–1 || Dempster (2–2) || Happ (2–2) || Hanrahan (4) || Rogers Centre || 25,851 || 20–8 || W2
|- style="text-align:center; background-color:#ffbbbb;"
| 29 || May 3 || @ Rangers || 0–7 || Holland (2–2) || Doubront (3–1) ||  || Rangers Ballpark || 42,441 || 20–9 || L1
|- style="text-align:center; background-color:#ffbbbb;"
| 30 || May 4 || @ Rangers || 1–5 || Ogando (3–2) || Lackey (1–2) ||  || Rangers Ballpark || 47,173 || 20–10 || L2
|- style="text-align:center; background-color:#ffbbbb;"
| 31 || May 5 || @ Rangers || 3–4 || Nathan (1–0) || Mortensen (0–2) ||  || Rangers Ballpark || 46,228 || 20–11 || L3
|- style="text-align:center; background-color:#bbffbb;"
| 32 || May 6 || Twins || 6–5 || Mortensen (1–2) || Burton (0–1) ||  || Fenway Park || 31,088 || 21–11 || W1
|- style="text-align:center; background-color:#ffbbbb;"
| 33 || May 7 || Twins || 1–6 || Diamond (3–2) || Dempster (2–3) ||  || Fenway Park || 30,549 || 21–12 || L1
|- style="text-align:center; background-color:#ffbbbb;"
| 34 || May 8 || Twins || 8–15 || Pressly (1–0) || Webster (0–1) ||  || Fenway Park || 29,969 || 21–13 || L2
|- style="text-align:center; background-color:#ffbbbb;"
| 35 || May 9 || Twins || 3–5 || Correia (4–2) || Lackey (1–3) || Perkins (8) || Fenway Park || 31,571 || 21–14 || L3
|- style="text-align:center; background-color:#bbffbb;"
| 36 || May 10 || Blue Jays || 5–0 || Lester (5–0) || Ortiz (0–1) ||  || Fenway Park || 33,606 || 22–14 || W1
|- style="text-align:center; background-color:#ffbbbb;"
| 37 || May 11 || Blue Jays || 2–3 || Oliver (2–1) || Tazawa (2–2) || Janssen (10) || Fenway Park || 36,543 || 22–15 || L1
|- style="text-align:center; background-color:#ffbbbb;"
| 38 || May 12 || Blue Jays || 4–12 || Jenkins (1–0) || Dempster (2–4) ||  || Fenway Park || 35,532 || 22–16 || L2
|- style="text-align:center; background-color:#ffbbbb;"
| 39 || May 14 || @ Rays || 3–5 || Moore (7–0) || Lackey (1–4) || Rodney (7) || Tropicana Field || 15,227 || 22–17 || L3
|- style="text-align:center; background-color:#bbffbb;"
| 40 || May 15 || @ Rays || 9–2 || Lester (6–0) || Price (1–4) ||  || Tropicana Field || 15,767 || 23–17 || W1
|- style="text-align:center; background-color:#bbffbb;"
| 41 || May 16 || @ Rays || 4–3 || Tazawa (3–2) || Rodney (1–2) ||  || Tropicana Field || 16,055 || 24–17 || W2
|- style="text-align:center; background-color:#bbffbb;"
| 42 || May 17 || @ Twins || 3–2 || Wilson (1–0) || Roenicke (1–1) ||  Uehara (1) || Target Field || 30,210 || 25–17 || W3
|- style="text-align:center; background-color:#bbffbb;"
| 43 || May 18 || @ Twins || 12–5 || Breslow (1–0) || Diamond (3–4) ||  || Target Field || 36,967 || 26–17 || W4
|- style="text-align:center; background-color:#bbffbb;"
| 44 || May 19 || @ Twins || 5–1 || Lackey (2–4) || Hernández (2–1) ||  || Target Field || 33,042 || 27–17 || W5
|- style="text-align:center; background-color:#ffbbbb;"
| 45 || May 20 || @ White Sox || 4–6 || Axelrod (2–3) || Lester (6–1) || Reed (15) || U.S. Cellular Field || 21,816 || 27–18 || L1
|- style="text-align:center; background-color:#ffbbbb;"
| 46 || May 21 || @ White Sox || 1–3 || Quintana (3–1) || Doubront (3–2) || Reed (16) || U.S. Cellular Field || 21,984 || 27–19 || L2
|- style="text-align:center; background-color:#bbffbb;"
| 47 || May 22 || @ White Sox || 6–2 || Buchholz (7–0) || Santiago (1–3) ||  || U.S. Cellular Field || 21,298 || 28–19 || W1
|- style="text-align:center; background-color:#ffbbbb;"
| 48 || May 23 || Indians || 3–12 || McAllister (4–3) || Dempster (2–5) || Barnes (1) || Fenway Park || 35,254 || 28–20 || L1
|- style="text-align:center; background-color:#bbffbb;"
| 49 || May 24 || Indians || 8–1 || Lackey (3–4) || Masterson (7–3) ||  || Fenway Park || 34,074 || 29–20 || W1
|- style="text-align:center; background-color:#bbffbb;"
| 50 || May 25 || Indians || 7–4 || Tazawa (4–2) || Pestano (1–1) || Bailey (6) || Fenway Park || 36,504 || 30–20 || W2
|- style="text-align:center; background-color:#bbffbb;"
| 51 || May 26 || Indians || 6–5 || Breslow (2–0) || Perez (2–1) ||  || Fenway Park || 37,046 || 31–20 || W3
|- style="text-align:center; background-color:#bbffbb;"
| 52 || May 27 || Phillies || 9–3 || Aceves (2–1) || Cloyd (1–1) ||  || Fenway Park || 33,627 || 32–20 || W4
|- style="text-align:center; background-color:#ffbbbb;"
| 53 || May 28 || Phillies || 1–3 || Lee (6–2) || Dempster (2–6) || Papelbon (10) || Fenway Park || 33,463 || 32–21 || L1
|- style="text-align:center; background-color:#ffbbbb;"
| 54 || May 29 || @ Phillies || 3–4 || Kendrick (5–3) || Lackey (3–5) || Papelbon (11) || Citizens Bank Park  || 38,831 || 32–22 || L2
|- style="text-align:center; background-color:#bbffbb;"
| 55 || May 30 || @ Phillies || 9–2 || Morales (1–0) || Pettibone (3–1) || || Citizens Bank Park  || 40,083 || 33–22 || W1
|- style="text-align:center; background-color:#ffbbbb;"
| 56 || May 31 || @ Yankees || 1–4 || Sabathia (5–4) || Lester (6–2) || Rivera (19) || Yankee Stadium  || 45,141 || 33–23 || L1
|-

|- style="text-align:center; background-color:#bbffbb;"
| 57 || June 1 || @ Yankees || 11–1 || Doubront (4–2) || Hughes (2–4) ||  || Yankee Stadium  || 48,784 || 34–23 || W1
|- style="text-align:center; background-color:#bbffbb;"
| 58 || June 2 || @ Yankees || 3–0 (6) (rain) || Buchholz (8–0) || Kuroda (6–4) ||  || Yankee Stadium  || 43,613 || 35–23 || W2
|- style="text-align:center; background-color:#bbffbb;"
| 59 || June 4 || Rangers || 17–5 || Dempster (3–6) || Grimm (5–4) ||  || Fenway Park  || 32,035 || 36–23 || W3
|- style="text-align:center; background-color:#ffbbbb;"
| 60 || June 5 || Rangers || 2–3 || Cotts (1–0) || Breslow (2–1) || Nathan (18) || Fenway Park  || 33,296 || 36–24 || L1
|- style="text-align:center; background-color:#bbffbb;"
| 61 || June 6 || Rangers || 6–3 || Bailey (2–0) || Kirman (0–2) ||  || Fenway Park  || 35,352 || 37–24 || W1
|- style="text-align:center; background-color:#bbbbbb;"
| – || June 7 || Angels || colspan="8" | Postponed due to Tropical Storm Andrea. Made up on June 8 as part of a doubleheader
|- style="text-align:center; background-color:#ffbbbb;"
| 62 || June 8* || Angels || 5–9 || Hanson (3–2) || Doubront (4–3) || Frieri (14) || Fenway Park  || 34,499 || 37–25 || L1
|- style="text-align:center; background-color:#bbffbb;"
| 63 || June 8* || Angels || 7–2 || Buchholz (9–0) || Wilson (4–5) ||  || Fenway Park  || 36,518 || 38–25 || W1
|- style="text-align:center; background-color:#bbffbb;"
| 64 || June 9 || Angels || 10–5 || Dempster (4–6) || Blanton (1–10) ||  || Fenway Park  || 37,054 || 39–25 || W2
|- style="text-align:center; background-color:#bbffbb;"
| 65 || June 10 || @ Rays || 10–8 (14) || Morales (2–0) || Ramos (1–2) ||  || Tropicana Field  || 15,477 || 40–25 || W3
|- style="text-align:center; background-color:#ffbbbb;"
| 66 || June 11 || @ Rays || 3–8 || Hernández (4–6) || Lester (6–3) ||  || Tropicana Field  || 16,870 || 40–26 || L1
|- style="text-align:center; background-color:#bbffbb;"
| 67 || June 12 || @ Rays || 2–1 || Aceves (3–1) || Archer (1–2) || Bailey (7) || Tropicana Field || 15,091 || 41–26 || W1
|- style="text-align:center; background-color:#ffbbbb;"
| 68 || June 13 || @ Orioles || 4–5 (13) || McFarland (1–0) || Wilson (1–1) ||  || Camden Yards  || 20,098 || 41–27 || L1
|- style="text-align:center; background-color:#ffbbbb;"
| 69 || June 14 || @ Orioles || 0–2 || Tillman (7–2) || Dempster (4–7) || Johnson (24) || Camden Yards  || 39,158 || 41–28 || L2
|- style="text-align:center; background-color:#bbffbb;"
| 70 || June 15 || @ Orioles || 5–4 || Lackey (4–5) || García (3–4) || Bailey (8) || Camden Yards  || 42,422 || 42–28 || W1
|- style="text-align:center; background-color:#ffbbbb;"
| 71 || June 16 || @ Orioles || 3–6 || Gonzalez (5–2) || Lester (6–4) || Johnson (25) || Camden Yards  || 41,311 || 42–29 || L1
|- style="text-align:center; background-color:#bbffbb;"
| 72 || June 18* || Rays || 5–1 || Aceves (4–1) || Archer (1–3) ||  || Fenway Park  || 33,430 || 43–29 || W1
|- style="text-align:center; background-color:#bbffbb;"
| 73 || June 18* || Rays || 3–1 || Bailey (3–0) || Peralta (1–3) ||  || Fenway Park  || 32,156 || 44–29 || W2
|- style="text-align:center; background-color:#ffbbbb;"
| 74 || June 19 || Rays || 2–6 || Hellickson (5–3) || Dempster (4–8) ||  || Fenway Park  || 35,710 || 44–30 || L1
|- style="text-align:center; background-color:#ffbbbb;"
| 75 || June 20 || @ Tigers || 3–4 || Smyly (3–0) || Bailey (3–1) ||  || Comerica Park  || 36,939 || 44–31 || L2
|- style="text-align:center; background-color:#bbffbb;"
| 76 || June 21 || @ Tigers || 10–6 || Lester (7–4) || Fister (6–5) ||  || Comerica Park  || 41,126 || 45–31 || W1
|- style="text-align:center; background-color:#ffbbbb;"
| 77 || June 22 || @ Tigers || 3–10 || Scherzer (11–0) || Webster (0–2) ||  || Comerica Park  || 42,508 || 45–32 || L1
|- style="text-align:center; background-color:#ffbbbb;"
| 78 || June 23 || @ Tigers || 5–7 || Benoit (2–0) || Miller (0–2) ||  || Comerica Park  || 41,507 || 45–33 || L2
|- style="text-align:center; background-color:#bbffbb;"
| 79 || June 25 || Rockies || 11–4 || Dempster (5–8) || Nicasio (4–4) ||  || Fenway Park  || 36,286 || 46–33 || W1
|- style="text-align:center; background-color:#bbffbb;"
| 80 || June 26 || Rockies || 5–3 || Lackey (5–5) || Oswalt (0–2) || Uehara (2) || Fenway Park  || 34,632 || 47–33 || W2
|- style="text-align:center; background-color:#bbffbb;"
| 81 || June 27 || Blue Jays || 7–4 || Lester (8–4) || Wang (1–1) || Uehara (3) || Fenway Park  || 34,750 || 48–33 || W3
|- style="text-align:center; background-color:#bbffbb;"
| 82 || June 28 || Blue Jays || 7–5 || Miller (1–2) || Wagner (1–2) || Uehara (4) || Fenway Park  || 36,383 || 49–33 || W4
|- style="text-align:center; background-color:#ffbbbb;"
| 83 || June 29 || Blue Jays || 2–6 || Delabar (5–1) || Tazawa (4–3) ||  || Fenway Park  || 37,437 || 49–34 || L1
|- style="text-align:center; background-color:#bbffbb;"
| 84 || June 30 || Blue Jays || 5–4 || Uehara (1–0) || Pérez (1–1) ||  || Fenway Park  || 37,425 || 50–34 || W1
|-
|colspan=11 style="text-align:left"|*Day–night doubleheaders
|-

|- style="text-align:center; background-color:#bbffbb;"
| 85 || July 2 || Padres || 4–1 || Lackey (6–5) || Erlin (1–1) || Uehara (5) || Fenway Park  || 36,498 || 51–34 || W2
|- style="text-align:center; background-color:#bbffbb;"
| 86 || July 3 || Padres || 2–1 || Uehara (2–0) || Gregerson (4–4) ||  || Fenway Park  || 36,911 || 52–34 || W3
|- style="text-align:center; background-color:#bbffbb;"
| 87 || July 4 || Padres || 8–2 || Webster (1–2) || Stults (6–7) ||  || Fenway Park  || 37,607 || 53–34 || W4
|- style="text-align:center; background-color:#bbffbb;"
| 88 || July 5 || @ Angels || 6–2 || Doubront (5–3) || Wilson (8–6) ||  || Angel Stadium of Anaheim  || 37,902 || 54–34 || W5
|- style="text-align:center; background-color:#ffbbbb;"
| 89 || July 6 || @ Angels || 7–9 (11) || De La Rosa (4–1) || Breslow (2–2) ||  || Angel Stadium of Anaheim  || 36,112 || 54–35 || L1
|- style="text-align:center; background-color:#ffbbbb;"
| 90 || July 7 || @ Angels || 0–3 || Weaver (3–4) || Lackey (6–6) || Frieri (22) || Angel Stadium of Anaheim  || 39,018 || 54–36 || L2
|- style="text-align:center; background-color:#ffbbbb;"
| 91 || July 8 || @ Mariners || 4–11 || Hernández (9–4) || Lester (8–5) ||  || Safeco Field  || 21,830 || 54–37 || L3
|- style="text-align:center; background-color:#bbffbb;"
| 92 || July 9 || @ Mariners || 11–8 || Breslow (3–2) || Beavan (0–2) || Uehara (6) || Safeco Field  || 21,072 || 55–37 || W1
|- style="text-align:center; background-color:#bbffbb;"
| 93 || July 10 || @ Mariners || 11–4 || Doubront (6–3) || Harang (4–8) ||  || Safeco Field  || 20,480 || 56–37 || W2
|- style="text-align:center; background-color:#bbffbb;"
| 94 || July 11 || @ Mariners || 8–7 (10) || Wright (1–0) || Wilhelmsen (0–3) || Uehara (7) || Safeco Field  || 25,367 || 57–37 || W3
|- style="text-align:center; background-color:#bbffbb;"
| 95 || July 12 || @ Athletics || 4–2 || Lackey (7–6) || Doolittle (3–3) || Uehara (8) || O.co Coliseum  || 27,084 || 58–37 || W4
|- style="text-align:center; background-color:#ffbbbb;"
| 96 || July 13 || @ Athletics || 0–3 || Griffin (8–6) || Lester (8–6) || Balfour (25) || O.co Coliseum  || 36,067 || 58–38 || L1
|- style="text-align:center; background-color:#ffbbbb;"
| 97 || July 14 || @ Athletics || 2–3 (11) || Cook (2–2) || Thornton (0–4) ||  || O.co Coliseum  || 31,417 || 58–39 || L2
|- style="text-align:center; background-color:#bbcaff;"
| ASG || July 16 || All-Star Game || AL 3–0 NL || Sale AL, (CWS) || Corbin NL, (ARI) || Nathan AL, (TEX) || Citi Field  || 45,186 || || Box
|- style="text-align:center; background-color:#bbffbb;"
| 98 || July 19 || Yankees || 4–2 || Doubront (7–3) || Pettitte (7–7) || Uehara (9) || Fenway Park  ||  38,130|| 59–39 || W1
|- style="text-align:center; background-color:#ffbbbb;"
| 99 || July 20 || Yankees || 2–5 || Kuroda (9–6) || Lackey (7–7) || Rivera (31) || Fenway Park  || 37,601 || 59–40 || L1
|- style="text-align:center; background-color:#bbffbb;"
| 100 || July 21 || Yankees || 8–7 (11) || Beato (1–0) || Warren (1–1) ||  || Fenway Park  || 38,138 || 60–40 || W1
|- style="text-align:center; background-color:#ffbbbb;"
| 101 || July 22 || Rays || 0–3 || Moore (14–3) || Workman (0–1) ||  || Fenway Park  || 35,016 || 60–41 || L1
|- style="text-align:center; background-color:#bbffbb;"
| 102 || July 23 || Rays || 6–2 || Lester (9–6) || Hernández (5–11) ||  || Fenway Park  || 34,609 || 61–41 || W1
|- style="text-align:center; background-color:#ffbbbb;"
| 103 || July 24 || Rays || 1–5 || Price (5–5) || Doubront (7–4) ||  || Fenway Park  || 36,514 || 61–42 || L1
|- style="text-align:center; background-color:#bbbbbb;"
| – || July 25 || Rays ||colspan="8" | Postponed (rain) (Makeup date: July 29) 
|-  style="text-align:center; background-color:#ffbbbb;"
| 104  || July 26 || @ Orioles || 0–6 || Tillman (13–3) || Lackey (7–8) ||  || Camden Yards || 39,063 || 61–43 || L2
|-  style="text-align:center; background-color:#bbffbb;"
| 105 || July 27 || @ Orioles || 7–3 || Dempster (6–8) || Feldman (9–8) ||  || Camden Yards  || 44,765 || 62–43 || W1
|-  style="text-align:center; background-color:#bbffbb;"
| 106  || July 28 || @ Orioles || 5–0 || Lester (10–6) || Hammel (7–8) ||  || Camden Yards || 32,891 || 63–43 || W2
|- style="text-align:center; background-color:#ffbbbb;"
| 107 || July 29 || Rays || 1–2 || Price (6–5) || Doubront (7–5) || Rodney (26) || Fenway Park  || 37,242 || 63–44 || L1
|- style="text-align:center; background-color:#bbffbb;"
| 108 || July 30 || Mariners || 8–2 || Workman (1–1) || Saunders (9–10) ||  || Fenway Park  || 34,578 || 64–44 || W1
|- style="text-align:center; background-color:#bbffbb;"
| 109 || July 31 || Mariners || 5–4 (15) || Britton (1–0) || Luetge (0–2) ||  || Fenway Park  || 35,059 || 65–44 || W2
|-

|- style="text-align:center; background-color:#bbffbb;"
| 110 || August 1 || Mariners || 8–7 || Wright (2–0) || Pérez (2–3) ||  || Fenway Park  || 35,886 || 66–44 || W3
|- style="text-align:center; background-color:#ffbbbb;"
| 111 || August 2 || Diamondbacks || 6–7 || Delgado (4–3) || Beato (1–1) || Ziegler (6) || Fenway Park  || 37,652 || 66–45 || L1
|- style="text-align:center; background-color:#bbffbb;"
| 112  || August 3 || Diamondbacks || 5–2  || Peavy (9–4) || Corbin (12–3) || Uehara (10) || Fenway Park || 37,941 || 67–45 || W1
|- style="text-align:center; background-color:#bbffbb;"
| 113  || August 4 || Diamondbacks || 4–0  || Doubront (8–5) || McCarthy (2–5) ||  || Fenway Park || 37,611 || 68–45 || W2
|-  style="text-align:center; background-color:#ffbbbb;"
| 114 || August 5 || @ Astros || 0–2 || Oberholtzer (2–0) || Lackey (7–9) || Fields (1) || Minute Maid Park  || 24,543 || 68–46 || L1
|-  style="text-align:center; background-color:#bbffbb;"
| 115 || August 6 || @ Astros || 15–10 || Workman (2–1) || Lyles (4–6) ||  || Minute Maid Park  || 21,620 || 69–46 || W1
|-  style="text-align:center; background-color:#bbffbb;"
| 116  || August 7 || @ Astros || 7–5  || Tazawa (5–3) || Fields (1–2) || Uehara (11) || Minute Maid Park || 22,205 || 70–46 || W2
|-  style="text-align:center; background-color:#ffbbbb;"
| 117  || August 8 || @ Royals || 1–5  || Chen (5–0) || Lester (10–7) || Hochevar (2) || Kauffman Stadium || 21,121 || 70–47 || L1
|-  style="text-align:center; background-color:#ffbbbb;"
| 118  || August 9 || @ Royals || 6–9  || Bueno (1–0) || Britton (1–1) || Holland (31) || Kauffman Stadium || 29,485 || 70–48 || L2
|-  style="text-align:center; background-color:#bbffbb;"
| 119  || August 10 || @ Royals || 5–3  || Workman (3–1) || Guthrie (12–8) || Uehara (12) || Kauffman Stadium || 38,742 || 71–48 || W1
|-  style="text-align:center; background-color:#ffbbbb;"
| 120  || August 11 || @ Royals || 3–4 || Shields (7–8) || Lackey (7–10) || Holland (32) || Kauffman Stadium || 24,935 || 71–49 || L1
|-  style="text-align:center; background-color:#bbffbb;"
| 121  || August 13 || @ Blue Jays || 4–2 (11) || Uehara (3–0) || Loup (4–5) ||  || Rogers Centre || 32,816 || 72–49 || W1
|-  style="text-align:center; background-color:#ffbbbb;"
| 122  || August 14 || @ Blue Jays || 3–4 (10) || Lincoln (1–1) || Workman (3–2) ||  || Rogers Centre || 31,695 || 72–50 || L1
|-  style="text-align:center; background-color:#ffbbbb;"
| 123  || August 15 || @ Blue Jays || 1–2 || Buehrle (9–7) || Peavy (9–5) || Janssen (22) || Rogers Centre || 40,477 || 72–51 || L2
|- style="text-align:center; background-color:#ffbbbb;"
| 124 || August 16 || Yankees || 3–10 || Pettitte (8–9) || Doubront (8–6) ||  || Fenway Park || 38,143 || 72–52 || L3
|- style="text-align:center; background-color:#bbffbb;"
| 125 || August 17 || Yankees || 6–1 ||  Lackey (8–10)|| Kuroda (11–8) ||  || Fenway Park || 37,517 || 73–52 ||W1
|- style="text-align:center; background-color:#ffbbbb;"
| 126 || August 18 || Yankees || 6–9 || Sabathia (11–10) || Dempster (6–9) || Rivera (36) || Fenway Park || 37,917 || 73–53 || L1
|-  style="text-align:center; background-color:#bbffbb;"
| 127 || August 19 || @ Giants || 7–0 || Lester (11–7) || Lincecum (6–13) ||  || AT&T Park || 41,585 || 74–53 || W1
|-  style="text-align:center; background-color:#ffbbbb;"
| 128 || August 20 || @ Giants || 2–3 || Romo (4–6) || Morales (2–1) ||  || AT&T Park || 41,551 || 74–54 || L1
|-  style="text-align:center; background-color:#bbffbb;"
| 129  || August 21 || @ Giants || 12–1 || Doubront (9–6) || Zito (4–9) ||  || AT&T Park || 41,532 || 75–54 || W1
|-  style="text-align:center; background-color:#ffbbbb;"
| 130 || August 23 || @ Dodgers || 0–2 || Nolasco (10–9) || Lackey (8–11) || Jansen (22) || Dodger Stadium || 50,240 || 75–55 || L1
|-  style="text-align:center; background-color:#bbffbb;"
| 131  || August 24 || @ Dodgers || 4–2 || Lester (12–7) || Ryu (12–5) || Uehara (13) || Dodger Stadium || 48,165 || 76–55 || W1
|-  style="text-align:center; background-color:#bbffbb;"
| 132 || August 25 || @ Dodgers || 8–1 || Peavy (10–5) || Capuano (4–7) ||  || Dodger Stadium || 44,107 || 77–55 || W2
|- style="text-align:center; background-color:#bbffbb;"
| 133 || August 27 || Orioles || 13–2 || Doubront (10–6) || Chen (7–7) ||  || Fenway Park || 36,226 || 78–55 || W3
|- style="text-align:center; background-color:#bbffbb;"
| 134 || August 28 || Orioles || 4–3 || Breslow (4–2) || Hunter (3–3) || Uehara (14) || Fenway Park || 31,962 || 79–55 || W4
|- style="text-align:center; background-color:#ffbbbb;"
| 135 || August 29 || Orioles || 2–3 || Tillman (15–4) || Lester (12–8) || Johnson (41) || Fenway Park || 33,300 || 79–56 || L1
|- style="text-align:center; background-color:#bbffbb;"
| 136 || August 30 || White Sox || 4–3 || Dempster (7–9) || Santiago (4–8) || Uehara (15) || Fenway Park || 36,063 || 80–56 || W1
|- style="text-align:center; background-color:#bbffbb;"
| 137 || August 31 || White Sox || 7–2 || Peavy (11–5) || Danks (4–11) ||  || Fenway Park || 37,363 || 81–56 || W2
|-

|- style="text-align:center; background-color:#bbffbb;"
| 138  || September 1 || White Sox || 7–6 || Workman (4–2) || Rienzo (1–1) || Uehara (16) || Fenway Park || 37,053 || 82–56 || W3
|- style="text-align:center; background-color:#ffbbbb;"
| 139  || September 2 || Tigers || 0–3 || Fister (12–7) || Lackey (8–12) || Veras (21) || Fenway Park || 36,188 || 82–57 || L1
|- style="text-align:center; background-color:#bbffbb;"
| 140 || September 3 || Tigers || 2–1 || Lester (13–8) || Scherzer (19–2) || Uehara (17) || Fenway Park || 32,071 || 83–57 || W1
|- style="text-align:center; background-color:#bbffbb;"
| 141 || September 4 || Tigers || 20–4 || Dempster (8–9) || Porcello (11–8) ||  || Fenway Park || 33,720 || 84–57 || W2
|-  style="text-align:center; background-color:#bbffbb;"
| 142 || September 5 || @ Yankees || 9–8 (10) || Breslow (5–2) || Chamberlain (2–1) || Uehara (18) || Yankee Stadium || 40,481 || 85–57 || W3
|-  style="text-align:center; background-color:#bbffbb;"
| 143  || September 6 || @ Yankees || 12–8 || Workman (5–2) || Claiborne (0–2) ||  || Yankee Stadium || 44,117 || 86–57 || W4
|-  style="text-align:center; background-color:#bbffbb;"
| 144  || September 7 || @ Yankees || 13–9 || Lackey (9–12) || Huff (2–1) || || Yankee Stadium || 49,046 || 87–57 || W5
|-  style="text-align:center; background-color:#ffbbbb;"
| 145  || September 8 || @ Yankees || 3–4 || Rivera (5–2) || Workman (5–3) ||  || Yankee Stadium || 43,078 || 87–58 || L1
|-  style="text-align:center; background-color:#bbffbb;"
| 146 || September 10 || @ Rays || 2–0 || Buchholz (10–0) || Price (8–8) || Uehara (19) || Tropicana Field || 18,605 || 88–58 || W1
|-  style="text-align:center; background-color:#bbffbb;"
| 147 || September 11 || @ Rays || 7–3 (10) || Uehara (4–0) || Peralta (2–7) ||  || Tropicana Field || 19,215 || 89–58 || W2
|-  style="text-align:center; background-color:#ffbbbb;"
| 148 || September 12 || @ Rays || 3–4 || McGee (5–3) || De La Rosa (0–1) || Rodney (34) || Tropicana Field || 20,360 || 89–59 || L1
|- style="text-align:center; background-color:#bbffbb;"
| 149 || September 13 || Yankees || 8–4 || Workman (6–3) || Kuroda (11–11) ||  || Fenway Park || 37,542 || 90–59 || W1
|- style="text-align:center; background-color:#bbffbb;"
| 150  || September 14 || Yankees || 5–1 || Lester (14–8) || Sabathia (13–13) ||  || Fenway Park || 37,510 || 91–59 || W2
|- style="text-align:center; background-color:#bbffbb;"
| 151 || September 15 || Yankees || 9–2 || Buchholz (11–0)
|| Nova (8–5) ||  || Fenway Park || 37,530 || 92–59 || W3
|- style="text-align:center; background-color:#ffbbbb;"
| 152 || September 17 || Orioles || 2–3 || Hunter (6–4) || Uehara (4–1) || Johnson (46) || Fenway Park || 35,030 || 92–60 || L1
|- style="text-align:center; background-color:#ffbbbb;"
| 153 || September 18 || Orioles || 3–5 (12) || McFarland (2–1) || Morales (2–2) || Johnson (47) || Fenway Park || 38,540 || 92–61 || L2
|- style="text-align:center; background-color:#003399;"
| 154 || September 19 || Orioles || 3–1 || Lackey (10–12) || Tillman (16–7) ||  || Fenway Park || 36,436 || 93–61 || W1
|- style="text-align:center; background-color:#009900;"
| 155 || September 20 || Blue Jays ||  6–3  || Lester (15–8) || Rogers (5–8) || Uehara (20) || Fenway Park || 37,215 || 94–61 || W2
|- style="text-align:center; background-color:#ffbbbb;"
| 156 || September 21 || Blue Jays || 2–4 || Buehrle (12–9) || Buchholz (11–1) || Janssen (33) || Fenway Park || 37,569 || 94–62 || L1
|- style="text-align:center; background-color:#bbffbb;"
| 157  || September 22 || Blue Jays || 5–2 || Doubront (11–6) || Dickey (13–13) || Uehara (21) || Fenway Park || 37,020 || 95–62 || W1
|-  style="text-align:center; background-color:#ffbbbb;"
| 158 || September 24 || @ Rockies || 3–8 || Chatwood (8–5) || Lackey (10–13) ||  || Coors Field || 32,315 || 95–63 || L1
|-  style="text-align:center; background-color:#bbffbb;"
| 159 || September 25 || @ Rockies || 15–5 || Peavy (12–5) || Chacin (14–10) ||  || Coors Field || 48,775 || 96–63 || W1
|-  style="text-align:center; background-color:#bbffbb;"
| 160  || September 27 || @ Orioles || 12–3 || Buchholz (12–1) || Feldman (12–12) ||  || Camden Yards || 30,774 || 97–63 || W2
|-  style="text-align:center; background-color:#ffbbbb;"
| 161 || September 28 || @ Orioles || 5–6 || Gausman (3–5) || Tazawa (5–4) || Johnson (49) || Camden Yards || 36,556 || 97–64 || L1
|-  style="text-align:center; background-color:#ffbbbb;"
| 162  || September 29 || @ Orioles || 6–7 || McFarland (4–1) || De La Rosa (0–2) || Johnson (50) || Camden Yards || 44,230 || 97–65 || L2
|-

|Reference:

Postseason game log

|- style="text-align:center; background-color:#bbffbb;"
| 1 || October 4 || Rays || 12–2 || Lester (1–0) || Moore (0–1) ||   || Fenway Park || 38,177 || 1–0 || W1 
|- style="text-align:center; background-color:#bbffbb;"
| 2  || October 5 || Rays || 7–4 || Lackey (1–0) || Price (0–1) || Uehara (1) || Fenway Park || 38,705 || 2–0 || W2
|- style="text-align:center; background-color:#ffbbbb;"
| 3 || October 7 || @ Rays || 4–5 || Rodney (1–0) || Uehara (0–1) ||  || Tropicana Field || 33,675 || 2–1 || L1 
|- style="text-align:center; background-color:#bbffbb;"
| 4 || October 8 || @ Rays || 3–1 || Breslow (1–0) || McGee (0–1) || Uehara (2) || Tropicana Field || 32,807 || 3–1 || W1
|- style="text-align:center"
|colspan="11" style="background-color:#009900;color:white;"|RED SOX WIN SERIES 3–1
|-

|- style="text-align:center; background-color:#ffbbbb;"
| 1 || October 12 || Tigers || 0–1 || Sánchez (1–0) || Lester (0–1) || Benoit (1) || Fenway Park || 38,210 || 0–1 || L1
|- style="text-align:center; background-color:#bbffbb;"
| 2 || October 13 || Tigers || 6–5 || Uehara (1–0) || Porcello (0–1) ||  || Fenway Park || 38,029 || 1–1 || W1  
|- style="text-align:center; background-color:#bbffbb;"
| 3 || October 15 || @ Tigers || 1–0 || Lackey (1–0) || Verlander (0–1) || Uehara (1)  || Comerica Park || 42,327 || 2–1 || W2
|- style="text-align:center; background-color:#ffbbbb;"
| 4 || October 16 || @ Tigers || 3–7 || Fister (1–0) || Peavy (0–1) ||   || Comerica Park || 42,765 || 2–2 || L1 
|- style="text-align:center; background-color:#bbffbb;"
| 5 || October 17 || @ Tigers || 4–3 || Lester (1–1) || Sánchez (1–1) || Uehara (2) || Comerica Park || 42,669 || 3–2 || W1
|- style="text-align:center; background-color:#bbffbb;"
| 6 || October 19 || Tigers || 5–2 || Tazawa (1–0) || Scherzer (0–1) || Uehara (3)  || Fenway Park || 38,832 || 4–2 || W2
|- style="text-align:center;"
|colspan="11" style="background-color:#009900;color:white;"|RED SOX WIN SERIES 4–2
|-

|- style="text-align:center; background-color:#bbffbb;"
| 1 || October 23 || Cardinals || 8–1 || Lester (1–0) || Wainwright (0–1) ||  || Fenway Park || 38,345 || 1–0 || W1
|- style="text-align:center; background-color:#ffbbbb;"
| 2  || October 24 || Cardinals || 2–4 || Wacha (1–0) || Lackey (0–1) || Rosenthal (1) || Fenway Park || 38,436 || 1–1 || L1
|- style="text-align:center; background-color:#ffbbbb;"
| 3  || October 26 || @ Cardinals || 4–5 || Rosenthal (1–0) || Workman (0–1) ||  || Busch Stadium || 47,432 || 1–2 || L2
|- style="text-align:center; background-color:#bbffbb;"
| 4 || October 27 || @ Cardinals || 4–2 || Doubront (1–0) || Lynn (0–1) || Uehara (1) || Busch Stadium || 47,469 || 2–2 || W1
|- style="text-align:center; background-color:#bbffbb;"
| 5  || October 28 || @ Cardinals || 3–1 || Lester (2–0) || Wainwright (0–2) || Uehara (2) || Busch Stadium || 47,436 || 3–2 || W2
|- style="text-align:center; background-color:#bbffbb;"
| 6 || October 30 || Cardinals || 6–1 || Lackey (1–1) || Wacha (1–1) ||  || Fenway Park || 38,447 || 4–2 || W3
|- style="text-align:center;"
|colspan="11" style="background-color:#009900;color:white;"|RED SOX WIN WORLD SERIES 4–2
|-

|style="text-align:left; font-size:88%;"|*The winner of the 2013 American League Wild Card Game plays the Red Sox.  The Wild Card game was contested on October 2 between the Cleveland Indians and the Tampa Bay Rays at Progressive Field.  The Rays were victorious by a score of 4–0.
**The winner of the 2013 American League Division Series plays the Red Sox in the ALCS. The ALDS was contested from October 4 to 10 between the Oakland Athletics and the Detroit Tigers.  The Tigers won the series 3–2.
***The winner of the 2013 National League Championship Series plays the Red Sox in the WS. The NLCS was contested from October 11 to 18 between the St. Louis Cardinals and the Los Angeles Dodgers. The Cardinals won the series 4–2.

Detailed records

Awards and honors 
 Andrew Bailey – AL Player of the Week (April 15–21)
 Clay Buchholz – AL Pitcher of the Month (April)
 José Iglesias – AL Rookie of the Month (June)
 Will Middlebrooks – AL Player of the Week (September 2–8)
 Mike Napoli – AL Player of the Week (April 15–21, September 2–8)
 David Ortiz – Silver Slugger Award (DH)
 Dustin Pedroia – Gold Glove Award (2B)
 Shane Victorino – Gold Glove Award (OF), AL Player of the Week (July 29–August 4)

All-Star Game
 Clay Buchholz, reserve P (did not attend)
 David Ortiz, starting DH
 Dustin Pedroia, reserve 2B

Transactions

April 2013
On April 1, signed RHP Gerson Bautista for a minor contract.
On April 4, designated SS Stephen Drew to AA Sea Dogs for a assignment.
On April 8, off waiver 1B Mauro Gomez to the Toronto Blue Jays.
On April 9, optioned SS Jose Iglesias to AAA Red Sox.
On April 10, activated SS Stephen Drew from the 7-day disabled list, placed RHP John Lackey on the 15-day disabled list with a strained right biceps, retroactive to April 7, and recalled Alex Wilson from AAA Red Sox.
On April 11, designated DH David Ortiz to AAA Red Sox for a assignment.
On April 16, placed RHP Joel Hanrahan on the 15-day disabled list with a strained right hamstring, retroactive to April 14, and recalled Steven Wright from AAA Red Sox.
On April 17, designated LHP Franklin Morales for a rehab assignment.
On April 18, optioned LF Jackie Bradley Jr. to AAA Red Sox.
On April 19, activated DH David Ortiz from the 15-day disabled list.
On April 21, recalled RHP Allen Webster from AAA Red Sox.
On April 22, optioned RHP Allen Webster to AAA Red Sox, designated RHP John Lackey to AA Sea Dogs for a assignment.
On April 24, optioned RHP Steven Wright to AAA Red Sox, and recalled RHP Daniel Bard from Sea Dogs.
On April 25, optioned RHP Alfredo Aceves to AAA Red Sox, and recalled C Ryan Lavarnway from AAA Red Sox.
On April 26, sent RHP Joel Hanrahan to AAA Red Sox for a assignment.
On April 28, optioned C Ryan Lavarnway to AAA Red Sox, and activated RHP John Lackey from the 15-day disabled list.
On April 29, optioned RHP Daniel Bard to AA Sea Dogs.
On April 30, activated RHP Joel Hanrahan from the 15-day disabled list.

May 2013
On May 1, signed C Isaias Lucena for a minor league contract.
on May 6, placed RHP Andrew Bailey on the 15-day disabled list with a right biceps inflammation, retroactive to April 29, and activated LHP Craig Breslow from the 15-day disabled list.
On May 7, placed RHP Joel Hanrahan on the 15-day disabled list with a right forearm strain, and recalled RHP Allen Webster from AAA Red Sox.
On May 9, optioned RHP Allen Webster to AAA Red Sox, purchased the contract of RHP Jose De La Torre from AAA Red Sox, and  transferred RHP Joel Hanrahan from the 15-day disabled list to the 60-day disabled list.
On May 12, placed C David Ross on the 7-day disabled list with a concussion, and recalled C Ryan Lavarnway from AAA Red Sox.
On May 18, designated RHP Andrew Bailey to AAA Red Sox for a assignment.
On May 20,  activated RHP Andrew Bailey from the 15-day disabled list, and optioned RHP Jose De La Torre to AAA Red Sox.
On May 23, designated LHP Franklin Morales to AA Sea Dogs for a assignment, and designated C David Ross to AA Sea Dogs for a assignment.
On May 24, activated C David Ross from the 7-day disabled list, optioned C Ryan Lavarnway to AAA Red Sox, placed RF Shane Victorino on the 15-day disabled list with a left hamstring strain retroactive to May 21, recalled RHP Alfredo Aceves from AAA Red Sox, placed 3B Will Middlebrooks on the 15-day disabled list with a low back strain, and recalled SS Jose Iglesias from AAA Red Sox.
On May 25, signed LHP Rafael Perez for a minor league contract.
On May 28, optioned RHP Alfredo Aceves to AAA Red Sox, and activated LHP Franklin Morales from the 15-day disabled list.
On May 29, optioned RHP Alex Wilson to AAA Red Sox, and recalled Jackie Bradley Jr. from AAA Red Sox.
On May 30, signed 3B Mario Martinez for a minor league contract.

June 2013
On June 3, designated 3B Will Middlebrooks to AAA Red Sox for a assignment.
On June 6, designated RF Shane Victorino to AAA Red Sox for a assignment.
On June 11, recalled RHP Jose De La Torre from AAA Red Sox, placed RHP Clayton Mortensen on the 15-day disabled list with a strained right groin.
On June 12, optioned RHP Jose De La Torre to AAA Red Sox, and recalled RHP Alfredo Aceves from AAA Red Sox.
On June 13, recalled Alex Wilson from AAA Red Sox, optioned RHP Alfredo Aceves to AAA Red Sox.
On June 14, optioned RHP Alex Wilson from AAA Red Sox, recalled RHP Rubby De La Rosa from AAA Red Sox, traded 3B Pedro Ciriaco to the San Diego Padres as part of a conditional deal.
On June 16, recalled Pedro Beato from AAA Red Sox, optioned RHP Rubby De La Rosa to the AAA Red Sox.
On June 18, recalled RHP Alfredo Aceves from AAA Red Sox, placed C David Ross (baseball) on the 7-day disabled list with a concussion, placed RHP Clay Buchholz on the 15-day disabled list with a neck strain, retroactive to June 9, 2013, recalled C Ryan Lavarnway from AAA Red Sox, and recalled Alex Wilson from AAA Red Sox.
On June 19, optioned RHP Alfredo Aceves to the AAA Red Sox.
On June 20, designated RHP Clayton Mortensen to AAA Red Sox for a rehab assignment, signed SS Wendell Rijo for a minor league contract, and signed OF Aaron King for a minor league contract, and signed LHP Corey Littrell for a minor league contract.
On June 21, signed C Jon Denney for a minor league contract, signed OF Jordon Austin for a minor league contract, signed LHP Jake Drehoff for a minor league contract, signed OF Joseph Monge for a minor league contract.
On June 22, recalled RHP Allen Webster from AAA Red Sox, and optioned Pedro Beato to the AAA Red Sox,

Farm system

Source:

LEAGUE CHAMPIONS: Salem

References

External links

2013 Boston Red Sox season at Official Site
2013 Boston Red Sox season at ESPN
2013 Boston Red Sox season at Baseball Reference
2013 Boston Red Sox Media Guide
 2013 Boston Red Sox Draft Selections

Boston Red Sox
Red Sox
Boston Red Sox
American League East champion seasons
American League champion seasons
Boston Red Sox seasons
World Series champion seasons